Raman Thediya Seethai may refer to:
 Raman Thediya Seethai (1972 film)
 Raman Thediya Seethai (2008 film)